Death by Ecstasy is a science fiction novella by  American writer Larry Niven, set in the Known Space universe. It is the first of five Gil Hamilton detective stories, and provides most of the backstory for the character. It first appeared in the January 1969 edition of Galaxy under the title The Organleggers.

Plot summary
A belter, Owen Jennison, is found dead on Earth in a locked Los Angeles apartment. His death is an apparent suicide. Hamilton, a friend and former crewmate of Jennison, is called to the scene to investigate. He finds Owen with a droud (a wirehead's transformer) plugged into the back of his head. The latter apparently starved himself to death while continuously stimulating the pleasure center of his own brain.

Hamilton, refusing to believe that his friend would commit suicide or turn wirehead, suspects foul play.

Editions
 
 Spangler, Bill; Tidwell, Terry; Stiles, Steve (1991). Death by Ecstasy: Illustrated Adaptation of the Larry Niven Novella. Malibu Graphics.

References

1968 short stories
Short stories by Larry Niven
Known Space stories
Locked-room mysteries
Fiction about main-belt asteroids